Alicia Ester Smith (born 13 March 1984) is a South African former cricketer who played as a right-handed batter and right-arm medium bowler. She appeared in three Test matches, 37 One Day Internationals and 14 Twenty20 Internationals for South Africa between 2003 and 2010. She played domestic cricket for Boland.

References

External links
 
 

1984 births
Living people
Cricketers from Cape Town
South African women cricketers
South Africa women Test cricketers
South Africa women One Day International cricketers
South Africa women Twenty20 International cricketers
South Africa women's national cricket team captains
Boland women cricketers
West Coast women cricketers